Programming Language Design and Implementation (PLDI) is one of the ACM SIGPLAN's most important conferences. The precursor of PLDI was the Symposium on Compiler Optimization, held July 27–28, 1970 at the University of Illinois at Urbana-Champaign and chaired by Robert S. Northcote. That conference included papers by Frances E. Allen, John Cocke, Alfred V. Aho, Ravi Sethi, and Jeffrey D. Ullman. The first conference in the current PLDI series took place in 1979 under the name SIGPLAN Symposium on Compiler Construction in Denver, Colorado. The next Compiler Construction conference took place in 1982 in Boston, Massachusetts. The Compiler Construction conferences then alternated with SIGPLAN Conferences on Language Issues until 1988, when the conference was renamed to PLDI. From 1982 until 2001, the conference acronym was SIGPLAN 'xx. Starting in 2002, the initialism became PLDI 'xx, and in 2006 PLDI xxxx.

Conference locations and organizers 
 PLDI 2022 - SIGPLAN Conference on Programming Language Design and Implementation: San Diego, CA, United States
 General Chair: Ranjit Jhala
 Program Chair: Isil Dillig
 PLDI 2021 - SIGPLAN Conference on Programming Language Design and Implementation: Online due to COVID-19
 General Chair: Stephen N. Freund
 Program Chair: Eran Yahav
 PLDI 2020 - SIGPLAN Conference on Programming Language Design and Implementation: London, United Kingdom (planned); moved online due to COVID-19
 General Chair: Alastair F. Donaldson
 Program Chair: Emina Torlak
 proceedings 
 PLDI 2019 - SIGPLAN Conference on Programming Language Design and Implementation: Phoenix, AZ, United States
 Conference Chair: Kathryn S. McKinley
 Program Chair:    Kathleen Fisher
 PLDI 2018 - SIGPLAN Conference on Programming Language Design and Implementation: Philadelphia, PA, United States
 Conference Chair: Jeffrey S. Foster
 Program Chair:    Dan Grossman
 PLDI 2017 - SIGPLAN Conference on Programming Language Design and Implementation: Barcelona, Spain
 Conference Chair: Albert Cohen
 Program Chair:    Martin Vechev
 PLDI 2016 - SIGPLAN Conference on Programming Language Design and Implementation: Santa Barbara, CA, United States
 Conference Chair: Chandra Krintz
 Program Chair:    Emery Berger
 PLDI 2015 - SIGPLAN Conference on Programming Language Design and Implementation: Portland, OR, United States
 Conference Chair: Dave Grove
 Program Chair: Steve Blackburn
 Part of the Federated Computing Research Conference 2015
 PLDI 2014 - SIGPLAN Conference on Programming Language Design and Implementation: Edinburgh, Scotland, United Kingdom
 Conference Chair: Michael O'Boyle
 Program Chair: Keshav Pingali
 PLDI 2013 - SIGPLAN Conference on Programming Language Design and Implementation: Seattle, WA, United States
 Conference Chair: Hans-J. Boehm
 Program Chair: Cormac Flanagan
 PLDI 2012 - SIGPLAN Conference on Programming Language Design and Implementation: Beijing, China
 Conference Chairs: Jan Vitek, Haibo Lin
 Program Chair: Frank Tip
 PLDI 2011 - SIGPLAN Conference on Programming Language Design and Implementation: San Jose, CA, United States
 Conference Chair: Mary Hall
 Program Chair: David Padua
 Part of the Federated Computing Research Conference 2011
 PLDI 2010 - SIGPLAN Conference on Programming Language Design and Implementation: Toronto, ON, Canada
 Conference Chair: Ben Zorn
 Program Chair: Alex Aiken
 PLDI 2009 - SIGPLAN Conference on Programming Language Design and Implementation: Dublin, Ireland
 Conference Chair: Michael Hind
 Program Chair: Amer Diwan
 PLDI 2008 - SIGPLAN Conference on Programming Language Design and Implementation: Tucson, Arizona, USA
 Conference Chair: Rajiv Gupta
 Program Chair: Saman Amarasinghe
 PLDI 2007 - SIGPLAN Conference on Programming Language Design and Implementation: San Diego, California, USA
 Conference Chair: Jeanne Ferrante
 Program Chair: Kathryn S. McKinley
 Part of the Federated Computing Research Conference 2007
 PLDI 2006 - SIGPLAN Conference on Programming Language Design and Implementation: Ottawa, Ontario, Canada
 Conference Chair: Michael Schwartzbach
 Program Chair: Thomas Ball
 PLDI '05 - SIGPLAN Conference on Programming Language Design and Implementation: Chicago, Illinois, USA
 Conference Chair: Vivek Sarkar
 Program Chair:  Mary Hall
 PLDI '04 - SIGPLAN Conference on Programming Language Design and Implementation: Washington, D.C., USA
 Conference Chair:  William Pugh
 Program Chair: Craig Chambers
 PLDI 03 - SIGPLAN Conference on Programming Language Design and Implementation: San Diego, California, USA
 Conference Chair:  Ron Cytron
 Program Chair:  Rajiv Gupta
 Part of the Federated Computing Research Conference 2003
 PLDI '02 - SIGPLAN Conference on Programming Language Design and Implementation: Berlin, Germany
 Conference Chair: Jens Knoop
 Program Chair:  Laurie Hendren
 SIGPLAN '01 Conference on Programming Language Design and Implementation (PLDI): Snowbird, Utah, USA
 Conference Chair: Michael Burke
 Program Chair:  Mary Lou Soffa
 SIGPLAN '00 Conference on Programming Language Design and Implementation (PLDI): Vancouver, British Columbia, Canada
 Conference Chair:  James Larus
 Program Chair:  Monica Lam
 SIGPLAN '99 Conference on Programming Language Design and Implementation (PLDI): Atlanta, Georgia, USA
 Conference Chair: Barbara G. Ryder
 Program Chair: Benjamin G. Zorn
 Part of the Federated Computing Research Conference 1999
 SIGPLAN '98 Conference on Programming Language Design and Implementation (PLDI): Montreal, Quebec, Canada
 Conference Chair: Jack W. Davidson
 Program Chair:  Keith D. Cooper
 SIGPLAN '97 Conference on Programming Language Design and Implementation (PLDI): Las Vegas, Nevada, USA
 Conference Chair:  Marina Chen
 Program Chair:  Ron K. Cytron
 SIGPLAN '96 Conference on Programming Language Design and Implementation (PLDI): Philadelphia, Pennsylvania, USA
 Conference Chair:  Charles N. Fischer
 Program Chair:  Michael Burke
 Part of the Federated Computing Research Conference 1996
 SIGPLAN '95 Conference on Programming Language Design and Implementation (PLDI): La Jolla, California, USA
 Conference Chair: David W. Wall
 Program Chair:  David R. Hanson
 SIGPLAN '94 Conference on Programming Language Design and Implementation (PLDI): Orlando, Florida, USA
 Conference co-Chairs:  Barbara Ryder and Mary Lou Soffa
 Program Chair:  Vivek Sarkar
 SIGPLAN '93 Conference on Programming Language Design and Implementation: Albuquerque, New Mexico, USA
 Conference Chair:  Robert Cartwright
 Program Chair: David W. Wall
 SIGPLAN '92 Conference on Programming Language Design and Implementation: San Francisco, California
 Conference Chair: Stuart I. Feldman
 Program Chair:  Christopher W. Fraser
 SIGPLAN '91 Conference on Programming Language Design and Implementation: Toronto, Ontario, Canada
 Conference Chair:  Brent Hailpern
 Program Chair: Barbara G. Ryder
 SIGPLAN '90 Conference on Programming Language Design and Implementation: White Plains, New York, USA
 Conference Chair:  Mark Scott Johnson
 Program Chair:  Bernard Lang
 SIGPLAN '89 Conference on Programming Language Design and Implementation: Portland, Oregon, USA
 Conference Chair:  Bruce Knobe
 Program Chair:  Charles N. Fischer
 SIGPLAN '88 Conference on Programming Language Design and Implementation: Atlanta, Georgia, USA
 Conference Chair:  David S. Wise
 Program Chair:  Mayer D. Schwartz
 SIGPLAN '87 Symposium on Interpreters and Interpretive Techniques: St. Paul, Minnesota, USA
 Conference Chair:  Mark Scott Johnson
 Program Chair:  Thomas Turba
 SIGPLAN '86 Symposium on Compiler Construction: Palo Alto, California, USA
 Conference Chair:  John R. Sopka
 Program Chair:  Jeanne Ferrante
 SIGPLAN '85 Symposium on Language Issues in Programming Environments:  Seattle, Washington, USA
 Conference Chair:  Teri Payton
 Program Chair:  L. Peter Deutsch
 SIGPLAN '84 Symposium on Compiler Construction: Montreal, Quebec, Canada
 Conference Chair:  Mary Van Deusen
 Program Chair:  Susan L. Graham
 SIGPLAN '83 Symposium on Programming Language Issues in Software Systems: San Francisco, California, USA
 Conference Chair:  John R. White
 Program Chair:  Lawrence A. Rowe
 SIGPLAN '82 Symposium on Compiler Construction: Boston, Massachusetts, USA
 Conference Chair:  John R. White
 Program Chair: Frances E. Allen
 SIGPLAN Symposium on Compiler Construction 1979: Denver, Colorado, USA
 SIGPLAN Symposium on Compiler Optimization 1970: Urbana-Champaign, Illinois, USA

References

External links

bibliography for PLDI at DBLP

Association for Computing Machinery conferences
Computer science conferences
Programming languages conferences